Phoring is a 2013 Bengali feature drama film directed by Indranil Roychowdhury. It was produced by Chitrabeekshan Audio Visual PVT LTD., and is 126 minutes long. The film won the Prasad Labs post-production completion award for 2012.

Plot outline
An adolescent boy (Phoring, Bengali for "Grasshopper") grows up in a back-of-beyond township in North Bengal. Surrounded by the lush Dooars countryside, the town barely survives the shutdown of a factory. Maladjusted and a born loser, Phoring fights the voices in his head which he calls God. A new teacher (Doel) arrives in school, and opens up his mind to things unknown. Phoring starts to believe that this is not a dream. Doel invites Phoring to her house to nurture his creative skills. She also presents a cell phone to Phoring during Phoring's birthday. Phoring records a video of Doel while celebrating and dancing. This video tape is leaked out by one of Phoring's classmate Lattu. Doel is harassed by a group of older teachers. Phoring's mother warns Doel to stay away from him. An enraged Doel starts avoiding Phoring. Phoring is suspended from his school. Then Doel's brother comes and resides in Doel's house. One day Phoring and his friend discovers some firearms and a  transceiver in the locked down factories. Doel and his brother disappears abruptly leaving behind a trail of doubt and suspicion. Police then searches for them due to be linked with terrorism. Phoring decides to go looking for her in Kolkata. He stays many a days doing hard labour in a Muslim-owned hotel to survive in the city. At last he meets Doel in a jail. Before departing Doel promises him that she will write letter to him. He ultimately returns to his town.

Awards and screenings
Vincent Ward Prize. Asian New Talents Competition. Shanghai International Film Festival.2014
Best Project: Work In Progress Lab. Filmbazar 2012, Goa
Selection, Indian Panorama, 2013
Also Screened at: Indian Film Festival Los Angeles and Indian Film Festival Stuttgart, Chiocago South Asian Film Festival, Indian Film Festival, Prague. all in 2014.

Filmfare Awards East:
 Best Cinematography: Indraneel Mukherjee
 Best Background score: Prabuddha Banerjee
 Best Debut Actor: Sohini Sarkar
 Best Debut Director: Indranil Roychowdhury

Zee Bangla Gaurav Samman::

 Rituporno Ghosh Memorial Award: Akash Adhikary and Indranil Roychowdhury
 Best Actress (Jury) - Sohini Sarkar

References

External links

 

Indian drama films
Bengali-language Indian films
2010s Bengali-language films
2013 films